David Vogt (born 5 September 1975), best known by his stage name Charles Greywolf, is a German musician, record producer, mixer and recording engineer. He is best known as the guitarist of the power metal band Powerwolf.

He runs a recording studio in Berus, called "Studio Greywolf".

He's married to Helen Vogt, vocalist of Lighthouse in Darkness and formerly from Flowing Tears.

Career 
In 2002, David Vogt joined Red Aim as a bassist under a stage name "El Davide". In 2003, along with Benjamin Buss he created Powerwolf. They decided to take on pseudonyms and build up backstories around those (David Vogt – Charles Greywolf, Benjamin Buss – Matthew Greywolf). Soon, they were joined by the rest of Red Aim. He joined Flowing Tears in 2007.

As a record producer he has worked on albums by Autumnblaze, Demon Incarnate, Dying Gorgeous Lies, Gloryful, Godslave, Hammer King, Hatred, InfiNight, Kambrium, Lonewolf, Messenger, No Hope, Noctura, Powerwolf, The Last Supper, Tortuga, Turin Horse, Unchained and Vintundra.

Associated acts 
 Red Aim (2002–2006)
 Powerwolf (2003—present)
 Flowing Tears (2007–2014)
 Heavatar (2012–2014)

Discography

With Powerwolf 

 Return in Bloodred (2005)
 Lupus Dei (2007)
 Bible of the Beast (2009)
 Blood of the Saints (2011)
 Preachers of the Night (2013)
 Blessed & Possessed (2015)
 The Sacrament of Sin (2018)
 Call of the Wild (2021)
 Interludium (2023)

With Flowing Tears 
 Thy Kingdom Gone (2008)

With Red Aim 
 Flesh for Fantasy (2002)
 Niagara (2003)

With Heavatar 
 All My Kingdoms (2013)

As a producer 
 Autumnblaze – Every Sun Is Fragile (2013)
 Demon Incarnate – Demon Incarnate (2015)
 Demon Incarnate – Darvaza (2016)
 Dying Gorgeous Lies – The Hunter and the Prey (2019)
 Gloryful – Ocean Blade (2014)
 Gloryful – End of the Night (2016)
 Godslave – Thrashed Volume III (2012)
 Hammer King – Kingdom of the Hammer King (2015)
 Hatred – War of Words (2015)
 Infinight – Like Puppets (2011)
 Kambrium – The Elders' Realm (2016)
 Lonewolf – The Fourth and Final Horseman (2013)
 Lonewolf – Cult of Steel (2014)
 Lonewolf – The Heathen Dawn (2016)
 Lonewolf – Raised on Metal (2017)
 Messenger – Captain's Loot (2015)
 Messenger – Starwolf – Pt. 2: Novastorm (2015)
 No Hope – Beware (2017)
 Noctura – Requiem (2016)
 Noctura – Als Dornröschen mich betrog (2018)
 Powerwolf – Blood of the Saints (2011)
 Powerwolf – Alive in the Night (2012)
 Powerwolf – Preachers of the Night (2013)
 Powerwolf – Blessed & Possessed (2015)
 Powerwolf – The Metal Mass – Live (2016)
 Powerwolf – Metallum Nostrum (2019)
 The Last Supper – Solstice (2013)
 Tortuga – Pirate's Bride (2015)
 Turin Horse – Prohodna (2019)
 Unchained – Code of Persistence (2011)
 Vintundra – Isländskasagor (2012)

References

External links 

 Studio Greywolf

1975 births
Powerwolf members
Flowing Tears members
Red Aim members
German heavy metal guitarists
German heavy metal bass guitarists
German record producers
People from Saarlouis (district)
Living people